Leigh Hunt Glacier is a glacier in Antarctica,  long, flowing north-northwest to enter Brandau Glacier just west of Hare Peak. It was named by the New Zealand Geological Survey Antarctic Expedition (1961–62) for A. Leigh Hunt, founder and first chairman of the New Zealand Antarctic Society.

References

Glaciers of Dufek Coast